Spencer Davey (born  in Taunton, Somerset, England) is a rugby union player for the Newcastle Falcons in the Guinness Premiership. He plays as a centre.

External links
Guinness Premiership profile

1983 births
Living people
English rugby union players
Rugby union players from Taunton
Glasgow Warriors players